Eirik Sverdrup Augdal (born 20 July 1995) is a Norwegian cross-country skier.

He competed in five events at the 2013 European Youth Olympic Winter Festival, winning a silver and a bronze medal. At the 2014 Junior World Championships he won two gold medals, also competing at the 2015, 2016 and 2018 Junior World Championships with a fourth place at best.

He made his World Cup debut in February 2016 in the Holmenkollen 50 km race, collecting his first World Cup points in January 2018 in Seefeld where he finished 20th in the 15 kilometres. He improved to a 14th place in the March 2018 edition of the Holmenkollen 50 km.

He represents the sports club Ringkollen SK.

Cross-country skiing results
All results are sourced from the International Ski Federation (FIS).

World Cup

Season standings

References 

1995 births
Living people
People from Ringerike (municipality)
Norwegian male cross-country skiers
Sportspeople from Viken (county)